Robert Reilly may refer to:
 Robert Reilly (politician) (born c. 1939), member of the New York State Assembly
 Robert Reilly (footballer) (born 1959), former Scottish football midfielder
 Robert R. Reilly (born 1946), senior fellow at the American Foreign Policy Council
 Robert D. Reilly Jr., U.S. Navy officer

See also
 Robert Reily (1820–1863), colonel of the 75th Ohio Infantry regiment in the Union Army
 Robert J. Reiley (1878–1961), American architect
 Robert Riley (disambiguation)
 Robert O'Reilly (disambiguation)